Cheri Register (1945 – March 7, 2018) was an American author and teacher.  She wrote seven books and co-authored three, the most famous of which, Packinghouse Daughter, is a memoir based on her working-class upbringing in her hometown of Albert Lea, Minnesota. She was a two-time Minnesota Book Awards winner. Register earned a Ph.D. from University of Chicago where she also received her B.A. and M.A. degrees.

She also wrote about her experiences as mother of two adopted Korean children. Prior to taking up a writing career, she taught and published work on Scandinavian, primarily Swedish, women's history and literature. She taught classes in memoir writing at The Loft Literary Center.

She was Assistant Professor of Women's Studies at the University of Minnesota.

She suffered from Caroli disease, and documented her experiences in The Chronic Illness Experience: Embracing the Imperfect Life. Register died March 7, 2018.

Bibliography
Kvinnokamp och litteratur i USA och Sverige (1977), 
Mothers-Saviours-Peacemakers:  Swedish Women Writers in the Twentieth Century (1983), ISSN 0280-1809
Living With Chronic Illness:  Days of Patience and Passion (1987), Are Those Kids Yours?: American Families With Children Adopted From Other Countries (1990), The Chronic Illness Experience: Embracing the Imperfect Life (1999), Packinghouse Daughter: A Memoir (2000), Beyond Good Intentions: A Mother Reflects On Raising Internationally Adopted Children (2005), The Big Marsh: The Story of A Lost Landscape'' (2016), ISBN 0873519957

References

External links
Official website
Harper Academic biography
Cheri Register biography on As Simple As That!
The Loft Learning Center's biography of Register

1945 births
2018 deaths
People from Albert Lea, Minnesota
20th-century American women writers
20th-century American non-fiction writers
21st-century American women writers
American Book Award winners
American women non-fiction writers
21st-century American non-fiction writers